Mulugeta (Amharic: ሙሉጌታ) is a male given name of Ethiopian origin that may refer to:

Mulugeta Abate, Ethiopian songwriter and musician
Mulugeta Bekele (born 1947), Ethiopian physicist and academic
Mulugeta Buli (1917–1960), Ethiopian military general and politician
Mulugeta Gebrehiwot, Ethiopian former rebel prior to 1991 and founding director of the Institute for Peace and Security Studies in 2007
Mulugeta Seraw (1960–1988), Ethiopian student murdered in the United States
Mulugeta Wami (born 1982), Ethiopian marathon runner
Mulugeta Wendimu (born 1985), Ethiopian middle- and long-distance runner
Mulugeta Yeggazu (died 1936), Ethiopian military commander
Alpha Mulugeta, Ethiopian-American drag performer
Samson Mulugeta (born 1983), Ethiopian international footballer

Ethiopian given names
Amharic-language names